HSwMS Hälsingborg (J13)  was the third ship of the .

Design

Visby-class destroyers are 97.5 meters long and 9.2 meters wide. The hull was built of steel while the superstructures were built of light metal. The main superstructure was just about the midships and housed, among other things, crew kitchens, wheelhouse and maneuvering cabin as well as command bridge. The machinery consisted of three Penhoët A oil-fired steam boilers, which generated steam for two 36,000-horsepower Laval steam turbines, which in turn powered two propellers. This machinery gave the vessels a maximum speed of 39 knots. The main guns consisted of three Bofors 12 cm M/24 naval guns, one at bow and the rest in superfiring at stern. The air defense consisted of eight Bofors 40 mm m/36 anti-aircraft guns, consisted of two single guns on each side of midship and two twin guns on a platform at the aft. In addition, there were four Bofors 20 mm m/40 anti-aircraft guns, two 8 mm lvksp m/36 machine guns, torpedo tubes, and more than 40 mines and 16 depth charges could be carried.

History
Hälsingborg was built at Götaverken in Gothenburg and was launched on 23 March 1943 and commissioned on 30 November 1943.

In the early 1960s, Hälsingborg underwent an extensive rebuild. The front and aft 12 cm guns were replaced with 57 mm m/50 D anti-aircraft guns and the third was removed and replaced by a Bofors 37.5 cm M/50 anti-submarine rocket launcher. In addition, two more m/33 depth charges were added and the mine capacity was increased to 130 mines. Helicopter platform was built and new fire line was installed with a new radar antenna in a radome on the bridge deck. In 1965, the ship was reclassified as a frigate.

Hälsingborg was decommissioned on 1 July 1978, after which she was sold in 1979 for scrapping in Gothenburg. The ship's ship bell and coat of arms are now set up at the entrance to the wedding chapel in Helsingborg City Hall.

References

Notes

Print

External links

Visby-class destroyers
Ships built in Gothenburg
1943 ships